The Morrisania station was a station on the New York Central Railroad's Harlem Line, serving the community of Morrisania in the Bronx, New York City.

History 

The station was built in 1858, but after declining ridership, which paralleled the decline of this section of the Bronx, the station was closed in 1973 along with some other stations in the Bronx as well as all stations between Dover Plains and Chatham. The station had two side platforms, and was a local station on the four-track Harlem Line. The station was located at 168th Street and Park Avenue.

Originally, the station had a brick station house over the tracks on the tracks on the south side of the 168th Street bridge. Prior to the elimination of grade-crossings, the surface station had been located at 167th Street. There was no ticket agent at the station toward the end of its use. In 1964, only 40 daily commuters used the station. The New York Central Railroad was authorized to demolish the station in 1959. The station closed on July 2, 1973 along with several other stations in Penn Central's Metropolitan Region.

References

Former railway stations in New York (state)
Former New York Central Railroad stations
Railway stations in the Bronx

Railway stations closed in 1973
Morrisania, Bronx